Hippotragine gammaherpesvirus 1 (HiHV-1) is a species of virus in the genus Macavirus, subfamily Gammaherpesvirinae, family Herpesviridae, and order Herpesvirales.

References

External links
 

Gammaherpesvirinae